Mountains and hills can be characterized in several ways. Some mountains are volcanoes and can be characterized by the type of lava and eruptive history. Other mountains are shaped by glacial processes and can be characterized by their shape. Finally, many mountains can be characterized by the type of rock that make up their composition.

Types of mountains according to geology

Glacially sculpted mountains and hills 
 Arête
 Drumlin
 Esker
 Flyggberg
 Nunatak
 Pyramidal peak
 Whaleback mountain

Volcanic mountains 
 Cinder cone
 Complex volcano
 Guyot
 Lava cone
 Lava dome
 Mud volcano
 Pancake dome
 Pyroclastic cone
 Pyroclastic shield
 Shield volcano
 Stratovolcano 
 Subglacial mound
 Submarine Volcano
 Somma volcano
 Tuya
 Volcanic field
 Volcanic plug

Mountains with structure-controlled form 
 Bornhardt
 Cuesta
 Dome
 Fault-block mountain
 Fold mountain
 Hogback
 Homoclinal ridge
 Table and mesa
Tepui (Guiana Highlands)
 Traprock mountain

Other types of mountain or hill 
 Belki
 Bergsknalle
 Conical hill
 Golets (geography)
 Inselberg
 Kuppe
 Line parent
 Mound
 Mount
 Mittelgebirge
 Residual hill
 Tower karst
 Tumulus
 Barrow (British Isles)
 Kurgan (Eurasian Steppe)
 Ultra

Mountains defined by their vegetation
 Fell
 Grass mountain
 Kalottberg

Types of rock that make up mountains 
 Igneous
 Extrusive (see types of volcanoes, above)
 Intrusive
 Metamorphic
 Sedimentary

Groups of mountains
 Cordillera
 Inselberg field
 Hügelland
 Monogenetic volcanic field
 Mountain range
 Polygenetic volcanic field
 Undulating hilly land

References

Types